Marcel Noah Zylla (born 14 January 2000) is a Polish professional footballer who plays as a midfielder for Śląsk Wrocław.

Career
Zylla made his professional debut for Bayern Munich II in the 3. Liga on July 20, 2019, starting in the away match against Würzburger Kickers. On September 8, 2020, he joined the Polish Ekstraklasa side Śląsk Wrocław, signing a four-year contract. On October 2, 2020, he made his league debut; facing Cracovia as his team won 3–1.

Personal life
Zylla was born in Munich, Bavaria to Polish emigrants in Germany.

References

External links
 
 Profile at DFB.de
 Profile at kicker.de
 

2000 births
Living people
Footballers from Munich
Polish footballers
Poland youth international footballers
German footballers
Germany youth international footballers
German people of Polish descent
Association football midfielders
FC Bayern Munich II players
Śląsk Wrocław players
3. Liga players
Regionalliga players
Ekstraklasa players
II liga players